The London Chuck Berry Sessions is the sixteenth studio album by Chuck Berry, and consists of studio recordings and live recordings released by Chess Records in October 1972 as LP record, 8 track cartridge and audio cassette. Side one of the album consists of studio recordings, engineered by Geoff Calver; side two features three live performances recorded by the Pye Mobile Unit, engineered by Alan Perkins, on February 3, 1972, at the Lanchester Arts Festival in Coventry, England. At the end of the live section, the recording includes the sounds of festival management trying in vain to get the audience to leave so that the next performers, Pink Floyd, can take the stage; the crowd begins chanting "We want Chuck!".    His backing band were Onnie McIntyre (guitar), Robbie McIntosh (drums), Nic Potter (bass) and Dave Kaffinetti (piano). Both McIntosh and McIntyre would later form The Average White Band.

"My Ding-a-Ling", from the live side of the album, was edited to approximately 4 minutes for release as a single. A novelty song based around sexual double-entendres, it was Berry's first and only single to reach number 1 in both the US and the UK.

Background 
In May 1970, Howlin' Wolf traveled to Olympic Sound Studios in London, England, to record songs for The London Howlin' Wolf Sessions. The album was released in August 1971 and peaked at number 28 on Billboard magazine's R&B Albums chart and number 79 on the Billboard 200. Because of Wolf's success, Muddy Waters recorded his own London Sessions album in December 1971, and Berry did the same in 1972.

Critical reception
William Ruhlmann of Allmusic called the album Chuck Berry's "commercial, if not artistic, peak". Robert Christgau thinks the album is of bad quality, that his voice is croaky and the studio material only fillers.

Commercial performance 
The album was not even out for a month, when on October 27, 1972, The London Chuck Berry Sessions was certified gold by the Recording Industry Association of America with sales of 1,000,000 units. It is Berry's only album to be certified by the RIAA, and is his most successful release.

Track listing 
All songs written by Chuck Berry except as noted

Side one (studio recordings)
 "Let's Boogie" – 3:10
 "Mean Old World" (Little Walter) – 5:45
 "I Will Not Let You Go" – 2:49
 "London Berry Blues" – 5:55
 "I Love You" – 3:26

Side two (live recordings)
 "Reelin' and Rockin'" – 7:07
 "My Ding-a-Ling" (Dave Bartholomew) – 11:33
 "Johnny B. Goode" – 4:23

The release on cassette exchanged "I Love You" and "Johnny B. Goode" to create sides of near-equal length.

This version of "Johnny B. Goode" replaces the first verse of the original with the first verse of "Bye Bye Johnny".

Personnel

Musicians
According to sleeve notes
Chuck Berry –  vocals,  guitar
Derek Griffiths –  guitar on side one
Kenney Jones –  drums on side one
Dave Kaffinetti –  piano on side two
Robbie McIntosh –  drums on side two
Onnie Owen McIntyre –  guitar on side two
Ian McLagan –  piano on side one
Nic Potter –  bass on side two

Technical
Esmond Edwards –  producer
Bob Scerbo - production supervision
Mia Krinsky - album coordination
David Krieger – art director
Tim Lewis –  cover art

Charts

Album

US Singles

UK Singles

References

External links

1972 albums
Chuck Berry albums
Albums produced by Esmond Edwards
Chess Records albums